Gamasellus tschucotensis is a species of mite in the family Ologamasidae.

References

tschucotensis
Articles created by Qbugbot
Animals described in 1982